Abbottabad District is a district of the Pakistani province of Khyber Pakhtunkhwa. It is part of Hazara Division and covers an area of 1,969 km2, with the city of Abbottabad being the principal town. Neighbouring districts are Mansehra to the north, Muzaffarabad to the east, Haripur to the west, and Rawalpindi to the south.

History

Origin of name
The district is named after Major James Abbott, the first deputy commissioner of Hazara (1849–1853).

Hazara
During British rule Abbottabad became the capital of Hazara division, which was named after and contained the Hazara valley, a small valley in the outermost Himalayas, between the Indus in the west and Kashmir in the east.

The current Abbottabad District was originally a tehsil of Hazara, the Imperial Gazetteer of India described it as follows:

In 1976 the tehsils of Mansehra and Battagram were separated into the new Mansehra District, while the tehsil of Haripur became a separate district in 1991.

Administration

Provincial Assembly

Demography

At the time of the 2017 census the district had a population of 1,333,089, of which 677,857 were males and 655,196 females. Rural population was 1,039,104 (77.95%) while the urban population was 293,985 (22.05%). The literacy rate was 76.20% - the male literacy rate was 86.40% while the female literacy rate was 65.76%. 3,172 people in the district were from religious minorities, mainly Christians.

At the time of the 2017 census, 86.59% of the population spoke Hindko, 5.97% Pashto, 2.48% Urdu and 1.22% Punjabi as their first language.

The major language of the area is Hindko, which in the 1981 census was the mother tongue of % of households. The variety spoken in the city of Abbottabad has formed the basis of a literary language. It is very close to the Hindko varieties of Mansehra: the two share 86% of their basic vocabulary.
In the Galliat region in the southeast of the district, the language is still known as Hindko but becomes more distinct and gradually transitions into the dialects of Pahari.

Other languages, such as Pashto, Urdu and Punjabi, are found more in urban than rural areas.

Parks and protected areas
Under the Khyber Pakhtunkhwa Wildlife (Protection, Preservation, Conservation and Management) Act of 1975, two areas have been designated with the district: Ayubia National Park and Qalandarabad game reserve. Both areas cover only 6% of the landed area of the district.

The Ayubia National Park was established in 1984, this park covers an area of over 3,312 ha.

The Qalandarabad game reserve was established in 1980 with an area of 8,940ha.

Subdivisions 

Abbottabad district is divided into three tehsils, Abbottabad Tehsil, Havelian Tehsil and Tehsil Lower Tanawal (a.k.a. Sherwan Teshsil) as well as one urban administration area – Nawanshehr. There are fifty-one Union Councils in the district, 38 in Abbottabad tehsil and 13 in Havelian.

Election 2008
With the announcement by the Election commission of Pakistan that elections would be held on 8 January 2008 more than a dozen candidates filed their nomination papers in Abbottabad.

Political campaigns
Abbottabad was the centre of the Sooba Hazara movement that started after national assembly passed 18th amendment to change the name of province from North West Frontier Province (NWFP) to Khyber Pakhtunkhwa. The former governor of the province has been vocal in this opposition to the new name

Provincial assembly
The district is represented in the provincial assembly by four elected MPAs (PK-36 to PK-39):

Education
According to the Alif Ailaan Pakistan District Education Rankings 2015, Abbottabad is ranked 31 out of 148 districts in terms of education. For facilities and infrastructure, the district is ranked 72 out of 148.

See also
 2005 Kashmir earthquake

References

 
Districts of Khyber Pakhtunkhwa